Hwe (Ꚕ ꚕ; italics: Ꚕ ꚕ) is a letter of the Cyrillic script. Its form was derived from the Cyrillic letter Shha (Һ һ Һ һ) by adding a hook to the top of the left leg.

Hwe is used in the old Abkhaz alphabet, where it represents the labialized voiceless pharyngeal fricative . It corresponds to Ҳә. Its appearance is similar to the letter հ (ho) used in the Armenian script, but the difference between հ and ꚕ is that հ represents /h/ and ꚕ represents /ħʷ/.

Computing codes

See also 
Ҳ ҳ : Cyrillic letter Kha with descender
Ɦ ɦ : Latin letter H with hook
Cyrillic characters in Unicode
Ᏺ ᏺ : Cherokee letter Yo
Cyrillic letters